Gary West (born 25 August 1964) is an English former footballer. He made 250 appearances in the English Football League between 1982 and 1993, playing for numerous clubs; most notably Sheffield United, Lincoln City and Gillingham.

Career

Sheffield United
West began his career with Sheffield United, playing 75 league games for the "Blades" between 1982 and 1985. The 1983–84 season saw the club promoted from the Third Division in third place. They consolidated their Second Division status the next season, though following this West secured a £35,000 move to Lincoln City in August 1985.

Lincoln City
The "Imps" suffered relegation into the Fourth Division in 1985–86. They then crashed out of the Football League in 1986–87, finishing behind Torquay United thanks to their inferior goal difference; West was voted the club's Player of the Season.

Gillingham
West escaped Lincoln's fate of non-league football by signing with Gillingham of the Third Division for a £50,000 fee. He spent the 1987–88 and 1988–89 seasons with the "Gills". The club were relegation in his second season, West again escaped the fate of relegation, having been sold to Port Vale for £70,000 in February 1989.

Later career
His first Vale game was actually at Bramall Lane, a goalless draw on 28 February 1989. He played fourteen games for the club that season, as well as playing both the semi-finals and the final of the play-offs. He struggled with cartilage troubles and played just three games for Vale the next season, instead being loaned out to old club Gillingham in November 1990. He played just one league games for the "Gills" in his one-month loan. In January 1991 he joined another old club on loan, staying a month at Sincil Bank, where he played three games. In August 1991 he joined Lincoln City permanently for £25,000. He played eighteen league games for City in the 1991–92 season and also spent time on loan at Walsall before dropping into non-league football with Boston United.

Career statistics
Source:

Honours
Individual
Lincoln City F.C. Player of the Season: 1986–87

Sheffield United
Football League Third Division third-place promotion: 1983–84

Port Vale
Football League Third Division play-offs: 1989

References

1964 births
Living people
Sportspeople from Scunthorpe
English footballers
Association football defenders
Gillingham F.C. players
Port Vale F.C. players
Sheffield United F.C. players
Lincoln City F.C. players
Walsall F.C. players
Boston United F.C. players
English Football League players